Sorkh-e Kan or Sorkh Kan or Sorkhkan or Sorkhekan or Sorkhakan, also rendered as Sorkhegan or Sorkhagan, may refer to:
 Sorkh-e Kan, Ilam
 Sorkh-e Kan, Anbarabad, Kerman Province
 Sorkhakan, Bardsir, Kerman Province
 Sorkh-e Kan, Rigan, Kerman Province
 Sorkh-e Kan, alternate name of Sarneran, Rigan County, Kerman Province
 Sorkh Kan, Khuzestan
 Sorkhkan, Khash, Sistan and Baluchestan Province

See also
 Kan Sorkh